Bagnaia is a village in Tuscany, central Italy, administratively a frazione of the comune of Murlo, province of Siena. At the time of the 2001 census its population was 16.

Bagnaia is about 18 km from Siena and 16 km from Murlo.

References 

Frazioni of Murlo